Campeggi is a surname. Notable people with the surname include:

Filippo Maria Campeggi (1512–1584), Italian Roman Catholic bishop
Lorenzo Campeggi (d. 1639), Italian Roman Catholic bishop
Marco Antonio Campeggi (d. 1553), Italian Roman Catholic bishop
Silvano Campeggi (1923–2018), Italian artist